In mathematics, Hensel's lemma, also known as Hensel's lifting lemma, named after Kurt Hensel, is a result in modular arithmetic, stating that if a univariate polynomial has a simple root modulo a prime number , then this root can be lifted to a unique root modulo any higher power of .

By passing to the "limit" (in fact this is an inverse limit) when the power of  tends to infinity, it follows that a root or a factorization modulo  can be lifted to a root or a factorization over the -adic integers.

These results have been widely generalized, under the same name, to the case of polynomials over an arbitrary commutative ring, where  is replaced by an ideal, and "coprime polynomials" means "polynomials that generate an ideal containing ". 

Hensel's lemma is fundamental in -adic analysis, a branch of analytic number theory.

The proof of Hensel's lemma is constructive, and leads to an efficient algorithm for Hensel lifting, which is fundamental for factoring polynomials, and gives the most efficient known algorithm for exact linear algebra over the rational numbers.

Modular reduction and lifting
Hensel's original lemma concerns the relation between polynomial factorization over the integers and over the integers modulo a prime number  and its powers.

Making this precise requires a generalization of the usual modular arithmetic, and so it is useful to define accurately the terminology that is commonly used in this context.

The lifting process is the inverse of reduction.

For example, given a polynomial  and a factorization modulo  expressed as  lifting this factorization modulo  consists of finding polynomials  such that   and  Hensel's lemma asserts that such a lifting is always possible under mild conditions; see next section.

Statement 
This can be generalized easily, with the same proof to the case where the integers are replaced by any commutative ring, the prime number is replaced by a maximal ideal, and the -adic integers are replaced by the completion with respect to the maximal ideal. It is this generalization, which is also widely used, that is presented here.

Let  be a maximal ideal of a commutative ring , and 

Hensel's lemma asserts that every factorization of  modulo  into coprime polynomials can be lifted in a unique way into a factorization modulo  for every .

Lifting simple roots
An important special case is when  In this case the coprimality hypothesis means that  is a simple root of  This gives the following special case of Hensel's lemma, which is often called also Hensel's lemma.

Lifting to adic completion
This was one of the main motivations for introducing -adic integers. 

Proof

The main ingredient of the proof is that coprime polynomials over a field satisfy Bézout's identity.

Bézout's identity allows defining coprime polynomials and proving Hensel's lemma, even if the ideal  is not maximal. In these proofs,  means

Linear lifting

Suppose that for some positive integer  there is a factorization
 

Proof: By hypothesis,  is invertible modulo . This means that there exists  and  such that  

Let  of degree less than  such that
 
(One may choose  but other choices may lead to simpler computations.

One has  Indeed, one has

As  is monic, the degree modulo  of  can be less than  only if 

Thus, considering congruences modulo  one has

So, the existence assertion is verified with

Uniqueness
Let 

That is, one can suppose that

By hypothesis, has 

and thus

As  is invertible modulo , there exist  and  such that  Thus

using the induction hypothesis again.

The coprimality modulo  implies the existence of  such that  Using the induction hypothesis once more, one gets

Thus one has a polynomial of degree less than  that is congruent modulo  to the product of the monic polynomial  and another polynomial .

Quadratic lifting
Linear lifting allows lifting a factorization modulo  to a factorization modulo  Quadratic lifting allows lifting directly to a factorization modulo  at the cost of lifting also the Bézout's identity and of computing modulo  instead of modulo  (if one uses the above description of linear lifting). 

For lifting up to modulo  for large  one can use either method. If, say,  a factorization modulo  requires  steps of linear lifting or only  steps of quadratic lifting. However, in the latter case the size of the coefficients that have to be manipulated increase during the computation.

Quadratic lifting is based on the following property.

Suppose that for some positive integer  there is a factorization
 

Moreover,  and  satisfy a Bézout's identity of the form 
  
(This is required for allowing iterations of quadratic lifting.)

Let  One has

where 

Setting  and  one gets

which proves the second assertion.

Explicit example 
Let 

Modulo 2, Hensel's lemma cannot be applied since the reduction of  modulo 2 is simplypg 15-16

with 6 factors  not being relatively prime to each other. By Eisenstein's criterion, however, one can conclude that the polynomial  is irreducible in 
Over , on the other hand, one has

where  is a square root of 2 in  that can be obtained by lifting the above factorization.
Finally, in  the polynomial splits into

Using derivatives for lifting roots
Let  be a polynomial with integer (or -adic integer) coefficients, and let m, k be positive integers such that m ≤ k. If r is an integer such that

then, for every  there exists an integer s such that

Furthermore, this s is unique modulo pk+m, and can be computed explicitly as the integer such that

where  is an integer satisfying

Note that  so that the condition  is met. As an aside, if , then 0, 1, or several s may exist (see Hensel Lifting below).

Derivation 
We use the Taylor expansion of f around r to write:

From  we see that s − r = tpk for some integer t. Let

For  we have:

The assumption that  is not divisible by p ensures that  has an inverse mod  which is necessarily unique. Hence a solution for t exists uniquely modulo  and s exists uniquely modulo

Observations

Criterion for irreducible polynomials 
Using the above hypotheses, if we consider an irreducible polynomial
 
such that , then
 
 
but , hence the polynomial cannot be irreducible. Whereas in  we have both values agreeing, meaning the polynomial could be irreducible. In order to determine irreducibility, the Newton polygon must be employed.pg 144

Frobenius 
Note that given an  the Frobenius endomorphism  gives a polynomial  which always has zero derivative
 
For , this implies  cannot contain the root of unity .

Roots of unity 
Note
 
Because the Frobenius gives  all of the non-zero elements  are solutions. In fact, these are the only roots of unity contained in

Hensel lifting 

Using the lemma, one can "lift" a root r of the polynomial f modulo pk to a new root s modulo pk+1 such that r ≡ s mod pk (by taking m=1; taking larger m follows by induction). In fact, a root modulo pk+1 is also a root modulo pk, so the roots modulo pk+1 are precisely the liftings of roots modulo pk. The new root s is congruent to r modulo p, so the new root also satisfies  So the lifting can be repeated, and starting from a solution rk of  we can derive a sequence of solutions rk+1, rk+2, ... of the same congruence for successively higher powers of p, provided  for the initial root rk. This also shows that f has the same number of roots mod pk as mod pk+1, mod p k+2, or any other higher power of p, provided the roots of f mod pk are all simple.

What happens to this process if r is not a simple root mod p? Suppose

Then  implies  That is,  for all integers t. Therefore, we have two cases:

If  then there is no lifting of r to a root of f(x) modulo pk+1.
If  then every lifting of r to modulus pk+1 is a root of f(x) modulo pk+1.

Example. To see both cases we examine two different polynomials with p = 2:

 and r = 1. Then  and  We have  which means that no lifting of 1 to modulus 4 is a root of f(x) modulo 4.

 and r = 1. Then  and  However, since  we can lift our solution to modulus 4 and both lifts (i.e. 1, 3) are solutions. The derivative is still 0 modulo 2, so a priori we don't know whether we can lift them to modulo 8, but in fact we can, since g(1) is 0 mod 8 and g(3) is 0 mod 8, giving solutions at 1, 3, 5, and 7 mod 8. Since of these only g(1) and g(7) are 0 mod 16 we can lift only 1 and 7 to modulo 16, giving 1, 7, 9, and 15 mod 16. Of these, only 7 and 9 give g(x) = 0 mod 32, so these can be raised giving 7, 9, 23, and 25 mod 32. It turns out that for every integer k ≥ 3, there are four liftings of 1 mod 2 to a root of g(x) mod 2k.

Hensel's lemma for p-adic numbers 
In the -adic numbers, where we can make sense of rational numbers modulo powers of p as long as the denominator is not a multiple of p, the recursion from rk (roots mod pk) to rk+1 (roots mod pk+1) can be expressed in a much more intuitive way. Instead of choosing t to be an(y) integer which solves the congruence

let t be the rational number (the pk here is not really a denominator since f(rk) is divisible by pk):

Then set

This fraction may not be an integer, but it is a -adic integer, and the sequence of numbers rk converges in the -adic integers to a root of f(x) = 0. Moreover, the displayed recursive formula for the (new) number rk+1 in terms of rk is precisely Newton's method for finding roots to equations in the real numbers.

By working directly in the -adics and using the -adic absolute value, there is a version of Hensel's lemma which can be applied even if we start with a solution of f(a) ≡ 0 mod p such that  We just need to make sure the number  is not exactly 0. This more general version is as follows: if there is an integer a which satisfies:

then there is a unique -adic integer b such f(b) = 0 and  The construction of b amounts to showing that the recursion from Newton's method with initial value a converges in the -adics and we let b be the limit. The uniqueness of b as a root fitting the condition  needs additional work.

The statement of Hensel's lemma given above (taking ) is a special case of this more general version, since the conditions that f(a) ≡ 0 mod p and  say that  and

Examples 
Suppose that p is an odd prime and a is a non-zero quadratic residue modulo p. Then Hensel's lemma implies that a has a square root in the ring of -adic integers  Indeed, let  If r is a square root of a modulo p then:

 

where the second condition is dependent on the fact that p is odd. The basic version of Hensel's lemma tells us that starting from r1 = r we can recursively construct a sequence of integers  such that:

 

This sequence converges to some -adic integer b which satisfies b2 = a. In fact, b is the unique square root of a in  congruent to r1 modulo p. Note that the quadratic reciprocity law allows one to easily test whether a is a nonzero quadratic residue mod p, thus we get a practical way to determine which -adic numbers (for p odd) have a -adic square root, and it can be extended to cover the case p = 2 using the more general version of Hensel's lemma (an example with 2-adic square roots of 17 is given later).

To make the discussion above more explicit, let us find a "square root of 2" (the solution to ) in the 7-adic integers. Modulo 7 one solution is 3 (we could also take 4), so we set . Hensel's lemma then allows us to find  as follows:

Based on which the expression

turns into:

which implies  Now:

And sure enough,  (If we had used the Newton method recursion directly in the 7-adics, then  and )

We can continue and find . Each time we carry out the calculation (that is, for each successive value of k), one more base 7 digit is added for the next higher power of 7.

As an example where the original version of Hensel's lemma is not valid but the more general one is, let  and  Then  and  so

which implies there is a unique 2-adic integer b satisfying

i.e., b ≡ 1 mod 4. There are two square roots of 17 in the 2-adic integers, differing by a sign, and although they are congruent mod 2 they are not congruent mod 4. This is consistent with the general version of Hensel's lemma only giving us a unique 2-adic square root of 17 that is congruent to 1 mod 4 rather than mod 2. If we had started with the initial approximate root a = 3 then we could apply the more general Hensel's lemma again to find a unique 2-adic square root of 17 which is congruent to 3 mod 4. This is the other 2-adic square root of 17.

1 mod 2 → 1, 3 mod 4
1 mod 4 → 1, 5 mod 8 and 3 mod 4 → 3, 7 mod 8
1 mod 8 → 1, 9 mod 16 and 7 mod 8 → 7, 15 mod 16, while 3 mod 8 and 5 mod 8 don't lift to roots mod 16
9 mod 16 → 9, 25 mod 32 and 7 mod 16 → 7, 23 mod 16, while 1 mod 16 and 15 mod 16 don't lift to roots mod 32.

For every k at least 3, there are four roots of x2 − 17 mod 2k, but if we look at their 2-adic expansions we can see that in pairs they are converging to just two 2-adic limits. For instance, the four roots mod 32 break up into two pairs of roots which each look the same mod 16:

9 = 1 + 23 and 25 = 1 + 23 + 24. 
7 = 1 + 2 + 22 and 23 = 1 + 2 + 22 + 24.

The 2-adic square roots of 17 have expansions

Another example where we can use the more general version of Hensel's lemma but not the basic version is a proof that any 3-adic integer c ≡ 1 mod 9 is a cube in  Let  and take initial approximation a = 1. The basic Hensel's lemma cannot be used to find roots of f(x) since  for every r. To apply the general version of Hensel's lemma we want  which means  That is, if c ≡ 1 mod 27 then the general Hensel's lemma tells us f(x) has a 3-adic root, so c is a 3-adic cube. However, we wanted to have this result under the weaker condition that c ≡ 1 mod 9. If c ≡ 1 mod 9 then c ≡ 1, 10, or 19 mod 27. We can apply the general Hensel's lemma three times depending on the value of c mod 27: if c ≡ 1 mod 27 then use a = 1, if c ≡ 10 mod 27 then use a = 4 (since 4 is a root of f(x) mod 27), and if c ≡ 19 mod 27 then use a = 7. (It is not true that every c ≡ 1 mod 3 is a 3-adic cube, e.g., 4 is not a 3-adic cube since it is not a cube mod 9.)

Generalizations
Suppose A is a commutative ring, complete with respect to an ideal  and let  a ∈ A is called an "approximate root" of f, if

If f has an approximate root then it has an exact root b ∈ A "close to" a; that is,

Furthermore, if  is not a zero-divisor then b is unique.

This result can be generalized to several variables as follows:

Theorem. Let A be a commutative ring that is complete with respect to ideal  Let  be a system of n polynomials in n variables over A. View  as a mapping from An to itself, and let  denote its Jacobian matrix. Suppose a = (a1, ..., an) ∈ An is an approximate solution to f = 0 in the sense that

Then there is some b = (b1, ..., bn) ∈ An satisfying f(b) = 0, i.e.,

Furthermore this solution is "close" to a in the sense that

When n = 1, a = a is an element of A and  The hypotheses of this multivariable Hensel's lemma reduce to the ones which were stated in the one-variable Hensel's lemma.

Related concepts
Completeness of a ring is not a necessary condition for the ring to have the Henselian property: Goro Azumaya in 1950 defined a commutative local ring satisfying the Henselian property for the maximal ideal m to be a Henselian ring.

Masayoshi Nagata proved in the 1950s that for any commutative local ring A with maximal ideal m there always exists a smallest ring Ah containing A such that Ah is Henselian with respect to mAh. This Ah is called the Henselization of A. If A is noetherian, Ah will also be noetherian, and Ah is manifestly algebraic as it is constructed as a limit of étale neighbourhoods. This means that Ah is usually much smaller than the completion Â while still retaining the Henselian property and remaining in the same category.

See also 
Hasse–Minkowski theorem
Newton polygon
Locally compact field
Lifting-the-exponent lemma

References

 
 

Modular arithmetic
Commutative algebra
Lemmas in algebra